Jerald DeWayne Honeycutt (born October 20, 1974) is an American former professional basketball player.

Honeycutt played high school basketball at Grambling Lab in Grambling, Louisiana. He played collegiately at Tulane University, where he finished his career as the leading scorer and fifth leading rebounder in school history. He was inducted into the Louisiana Basketball Hall of Fame in 2006. He was selected by the Milwaukee Bucks in the 2nd round (38th overall) of the 1997 NBA Draft. Honeycutt played two years in the NBA for the Bucks and the Philadelphia 76ers, averaging 5.1 ppg in his career.

Honeycutt played for the CBA's Idaho Stampede and Grand Rapids Hoops. He earned All-CBA First Team honors with the Hoops in 2003. He also played internationally in the Philippines, Greece, Russia, Lebanon, Japan, and elsewhere. Honeycutt last played for the Toyota Tsusho Fighting Eagles of the Japan Basketball League. He has also played for the Panasonic Trians, the Mitsubishi Diamond Dolphins and the Hamamatsu Higashimikawa Phoenix.

NBA career statistics

Regular season

|-
| align="left" | 1997–98
| align="left" | Milwaukee
| 38 || 0 || 13.9 || .407 || .377 || .621 || 2.4 || 0.9 || 0.5 || 0.2 || 6.4
|-
| align="left" | 1998–99
| align="left" | Milwaukee
| 3 || 0 || 4.0 || .400 || .000 || .500 || 0.3 || 0.0 || 0.3 || 0.0 || 1.7
|-
| align="left" | 1998–99
| align="left" | Philadelphia
| 13 || 0 || 6.9 || .259 || .357 || .750 || 0.8 || 0.2 || 0.3 || 0.2 || 1.9
|- class="sortbottom"
| style="text-align:center;" colspan="2"| Career
| 54 || 0 || 11.7 || .391 || .362 || .632 || 1.9 || 0.7 || 0.5 || 0.1 || 5.1
|}

Playoffs

|-
| align="left" | 1998–99
| align="left" | Philadelphia
| 6 || 0 || 2.0 || .200 || .000 || .000 || 0.2 || 0.0 || 0.0 || 0.0 || 0.3
|}

References

External links
NBA.com player profile
NBA stats @ basketball-reference.com

1974 births
Living people
All-American college men's basketball players
American expatriate basketball people in the Philippines
American men's basketball players
Barangay Ginebra San Miguel players
Basketball players from Shreveport, Louisiana
BC Avtodor Saratov players
Grand Rapids Hoops players
Idaho Stampede (CBA) players
McDonald's High School All-Americans
Milwaukee Bucks draft picks
Milwaukee Bucks players
Nagoya Diamond Dolphins players
Panasonic Trians players
Parade High School All-Americans (boys' basketball)
Philadelphia 76ers players
Philippine Basketball Association imports
Power forwards (basketball)
San-en NeoPhoenix players
TNT Tropang Giga players
Toyotsu Fighting Eagles Nagoya players
Tulane Green Wave men's basketball players